Yucca faxoniana is a bladed evergreen shrub of the genus Yucca. It is known by the common names Faxon yucca, Spanish dagger, and giant dagger.

Description
The plant generally is a multitrunked shrub  in height.

Flowers, pollinated by moths of the genus Tegeticula, bloom typically in April. The plant produces sweet, pulpy, oblong fruits.

Taxonomy
The species has been called Yucca torreyi – a name given in 1908 by John Shafer. The epithet commemorates John Torrey, a 19th-century American botanist who designated this as a new variety in 1859. Y. torreyi is now regarded as an illegitimate name; however sources differ as to the correct name, using either Yucca treculeana Carrière or Y. faxoniana.

Distribution
Yucca faxoniana is native to the Chihuahuan Desert region of northern Mexico, southern New Mexico, and southwestern Texas. Its range is centered around Big Bend National Park in the central Rio Grande valley in the Chihuahuan Desert. It is found mainly in the Mexican states of Chihuahua and Coahuila, but also minor locales of Durango and Nuevo León. It does not occur in the upper Rio Grande Basin section in central New Mexico, nor the lower third of the Rio Grande Valley towards the Gulf of Mexico.

Uses
Native Americans used the fruit as a food source—raw, roasted, or dried and ground into meal. They also used the plant leaves as a fiber in basketry, cloth, mats, ropes, and sandals. The roots were used as a red pattern element in Apache baskets.

References

External links 

 USDA Plants Profile: Yucca torreyi 
 Lady Bird Johnson Wildflower Center: Yucca torreyi.

faxoniana
Flora of the Chihuahuan Desert
Flora of Northeastern Mexico
Flora of the Southwestern United States
Flora of Texas
Flora of Chihuahua (state)
Flora of Durango
Flora of Nuevo León
Flora of New Mexico
Flora of the Mexican Plateau
Plants described in 1859